Gabriella Fern Whelan (born 5 December 1988) is an English former footballer who played for Brighton & Hove Albion W.F.C. She previously played for both Liverpool and Everton in her native Merseyside and Notts County. She has represented England women's national football team at youth and senior level. A quick central defender, Whelan was named the FA Women's Young Player of the Year in 2008.

Club career
Whelan started playing football for her school's boys' team. Her school teacher played for Liverpool Feds and signed Whelan up to play for their junior side. She progressed to the Liverpool Ladies senior side before leaving to join Everton Ladies during the 2005 close season.

After playing in every round of the 2007–08 FA Women's Premier League Cup, Whelan missed Everton's 1–0 final win over Arsenal when she injured her cruciate ligaments in January 2008. Despite missing half the season with the injury, she was named the FA Young Player of the Year for 2007–08.

In the 2010 FA Women's Cup Final, Whelan came on as a second-half substitute for Rachel Unitt as Everton beat Arsenal 3–2 in extra time. After aggravating her previous knee injury, Whelan underwent surgery which saw her miss the entire 2012 and 2013 seasons. She declared a "brilliant feeling" in returning to the squad for 2014. Whelan was a late substitute in Everton's 2–0 2014 FA Women's Cup final defeat by Arsenal. When the 2014 season culminated in Everton's relegation, Whelan signed for Notts County on a two-year contract.

In March 2017, Whelan agreed an extension to her Notts County contract, only for the club to fold on the eve of the FA WSL Spring Series season. Instead she agreed to rejoin Everton on a free transfer.

International career
Whelan has represented England at Under-15, Under-19 (as captain), Under-20 and Under-23 levels. Whelan was named UEFA's "golden player" after inspiring England to the final of the 2007 UEFA Women's Under-19 Championship. She recovered from a serious knee injury to captain England at the 2008 FIFA U-20 Women's World Cup in Chile in November 2008.

National coach Hope Powell gave Whelan a first call-up to the senior England squad in October 2009, replacing Anita Asante who was withdrawn after the initial announcement of the squad. In May 2011 Whelan received another senior call-up when Fara Williams withdrew from the squad for a home friendly with Sweden. She won her first cap as a late substitute for Casey Stoney in England's 2–0 win.

Powell did not select Whelan for the 2011 FIFA Women's World Cup in Germany, but she made her first competitive appearance in England's 4–0 UEFA Women's Euro 2013 qualifying win over Slovenia at the County Ground, Swindon on 22 September 2011. At the 2012 Cyprus Cup Whelan won another cap as England beat Switzerland 1–0. During the tournament she suffered a recurrence of her cruciate ligament injury and underwent surgery which kept her out for nearly two years, causing her to miss the 2012 Olympic Games and UEFA Women's Euro 2013.

Personal life
Whelan attended St Pascal Baylon School in Court Hey. As well as being a professional footballer, Whelan is a qualified physiotherapist. Following her retirement from football, Whelan became an executive for equality, diversity and inclusion in women's football at the Professional Footballers' Association.

References

External links

Living people
English women's footballers
England women's international footballers
England women's under-23 international footballers
Liverpool F.C. Women players
Everton F.C. (women) players
Notts County L.F.C. players
FA Women's National League players
Footballers from Liverpool
1988 births
Women's Super League players
Women's association football defenders
Brighton & Hove Albion W.F.C. players
Liverpool Feds W.F.C. players
LGBT association football players